Seniors and Juniors Strikes Back is an Album by Marshmallow Coast and their 8th Album in Total.

Track listing 
Track listing:-

References 

2011 albums
Marshmallow Coast albums